Rashad Babaev (born September 3, 1981, Baku, Azerbaijan) is a FIDE trainer as of 2019. He is a full-time chess coach/arbiter. He was the Grandmaster (GM) in 2007. As a Grandmaster, he focused his profession in developing Young Talent.

Notable Tournaments

References 

1981 births
Living people
Chess grandmasters
Azerbaijani chess players
Chess coaches
Sportspeople from Baku